Oregodasys is a genus of worms belonging to the family Thaumastodermatidae.

The species of this genus are found in Central America.

Species:

Oregodasys ashleigha 
Oregodasys caymanensis 
Oregodasys cirratus 
Oregodasys itoi 
Oregodasys katharinae 
Oregodasys kurnowensis 
Oregodasys mastigurus 
Oregodasys maximus 
Oregodasys norenburgi 
Oregodasys ocellatus 
Oregodasys pacificus 
Oregodasys phacellatus 
Oregodasys rarus 
Oregodasys ruber 
Oregodasys schultzi 
Oregodasys styliferus 
Oregodasys tentaculatus

References

Gastrotricha